The World Allround Speed Skating Championships for Men took place on 17 and 18 February 1973 in Deventer at the IJsselstadion ice rink.

Classification

  *= Fell
 
Source:

Attribution
In Dutch

References 

World Allround Speed Skating Championships, 1973
1973 World Allround